James Alan "Jimmy" or "Jimmer" Broadbent is an English racing driver, content creator, sim racer and e-sports commentator.

Broadbent's YouTube channel Jimmy Broadbent has over 850,000 subscribers and is mainly about gaming, sim racing and his real life racing. He drives the Praga R1 for Praga in the Praga Cup alongside Gordie Mutch. He also commentates for Polyphony Digital's Gran Turismo series.

Broadbent's popularity has been partially attributed to his modest background, having lived in a shed in his mother's garden for a long period of time, and his honesty with personal struggles, both traits in stark contrast with the trend of internet celebrities portraying an artificial idyllic life.

YouTube career 
Broadbent began to create content for YouTube in 2012. He reached 10,000 subscribers in 2017; by 2018, he had around 86,000 subscribers. He was temporarily banned by YouTube between 14 and 15 April the same year by accident.

On 4 June 2018, Broadbent reached 100,000 subscribers on YouTube. In November of 2020, Jimmy raised over £71,000 for Mind in memory of his father, Alan Broadbent. By the end of the year, he had over 600,000 subscribers.

Commentary role 
Broadbent was invited by Polyphony Digital, the creators of the Gran Turismo video game series, to work as a commentator on their FIA-Certified Gran Turismo Championships.

Sim racing 
Broadbent alongside fellow YouTubers, Streamers and sim racers like Stephen J Bailey are part of Doug Henson Racing. In 2019 Broadbent and Bailey alongside Adam David Hodgkinson and Nathanael Lupson won the 2019 iRacing 24 Hours of Le Mans Virtual in the Audi R18 2016.

Broadbent took part in the 2020 Formula 1 Bahrain Virtual Grand Prix. During the race Broadbent and Lando Norris were in a battle for fourth place, with the former prevailing. 

Broadbent then took part in the 2020 Virtual Le Mans 24 Hours piloting the Aston Martin Vantage GTE for Mahle Racing alongside former IndyCar Series driver Robert Wickens, Deutsche Tourenwagen Masters driver  Ferdinand Habsburg and sim-racer Kevin Rotting. They classified in 46th place overall and 17th place in their class.

Broadbent returned to the event in 2022 racing the Porsche 911 RSR GTE for Team Project 1 x BPM alongside René Buttler, Bram Beelen and Tim Neuendorf. In the end, the team finished in 33rd place overall and 14th place in their class.

In 2023, it was announced that Broadbent would compete in the 2023 edition of the 24 Hours of Le Mans Virtual, returning to the  Mahle Racing BMW M8 GTE #10 entry alongside  W Series and  WEC driver Beitske Visser and sim-racers Muhammed Patel and Michele D’Alessandro.  The team qualified in 7th place setting a time of 3:46.894 and then in the race, finished in 9th place and 32nd place overall scoring 4 points.

Motor racing 

In March 2022, he founded Team87.  

In December 2022, it was announced that Broadbent would be taking part in testing of the 2023 spec BMW M4 GT4 in the Circuito de Almería in Spain with BMW Motorsport.

Britcar 

In 2021, it was announced that Broadbent would take part in the 2021 Britcar Championship with Team J2 Praga, driving the Praga R1 alongside Jem Hepworth.  During the first round of the championship in the Silverstone International circuit, Broadbent finished in P6 in Race 1 and P8 in Race 2. In the following race in Snetterton, Broadbent retired from Race 1 and finished in P10 for the second race. The third race of the season in Oulton Park proved a challenging one as Broadbent finished in P23 in Race 1 and then P12 in Race 2. In the fourth round of the season, Broadbent returned to Silverstone, this time in the Silverstone GP circuit. He finished the race in P6. Due to a support race fatality, the next round in Brands Hatch was cancelled. However, for the final race of the season, it was announced that Gordie Mutch would be replacing Hepworth as Broadbent's teammate to compete in Donington Park. The most successful race weekend of the year, Mutch and Broadbent went on to win both races in the Donington Round. In the end, Broadbent finished in P5 in the Overall Championship Standings.

Praga Cup 
In 2022 Broadbent re-signed with Praga for the manufacturer's one make series known as the Praga Cup. He drove alongside Gordie Mutch.  The team went on to win five races and the championship.

Personal life
Broadbent's father Alan Broadbent committed suicide when Jimmy was only 13 years old after struggling from alcoholism and depression. 

In an interview with DriveTribe in 2020 Broadbent told that around 2014 he "lost everything" due to depression and other mental health issues, especially regarding sociability. He lost his job, his house and his fiancée broke up with him. He stated that he had struggled and still struggles with depression and suicidal thoughts. 

With nowhere to live, he moved to a shed in his mother's house's garden. He stayed there and also produced content from there. The shed eventually became an inside joke of Broadbent and his YouTube community. In 2021, Broadbent bought his own house and currently lives there. Broadbent also owns 5 cars, a  R32 Nissan Skyline,  Nissan 350Z,   Nissan GT-R,  Subaru Impreza WRX Type-RA,  and a Mazda MX-5.

Racing record

Racing career summary 

* Season still in progress.

Complete Britcar results

Complete Praga Cup results

References 

1991 births
Living people
English YouTubers
YouTube streamers
English racing drivers
People from Hastings